Proeidosa polysema, the polysema skipper or spinifex sand-skipper, is a butterfly of the family Hesperiidae. It is found in Australia in the Northern Territory, Queensland and Western Australia.

The larvae feed on Triodia species, including Triodia microstachya, Triodia pungens and Triodia mitchellii. They construct a tent-shaped shelter made from silk and twisted leaves of its host plant where it rests during the day.

External links
Australian Insects
Australian Faunal Directory

Trapezitinae
Butterflies described in 1908